Ajoy Kumar Ghosh (20 February 1909–13 January 1962) was an Indian freedom fighter and prominent leader of the Communist Party of India. He was the general secretary of the Communist Party of India from 1954 to 1962.

Early life 
Ghosh was born in Mihijam village of Bardhaman district in the state of West Bengal, India. He went with his father Doctor Shachindranath Ghosh to Kanpur.

Political life 
In 1926, before entering Allahabad University, Ghosh met Bhagat Singh and Batukeshwar Dutt. He was a member of Hindustan Socialist Republican Association. He was arrested and later imprisoned after Lahore Conspiracy Case trial in 1929 but released due to lack of evidence. He was again arrested in 1931 and came into contact with Srinivas Sardeshai in prison. After release, he joined in the Communist Party of India. In 1934, he was elected to the Central Committee of the CPI and in 1936 he was elected to its Polit Bureau. In 1938, Ghosh became the member of the editorial board of the Party's mouthpiece, the National Front. He was the General Secretary of the Communist Party of India from 1951 till his death in 1962. He was leading the Communist Party of India during the China-India war in 1962 and supported China's position instead of that of India. He was the prominent person in the centrist faction before the split of the Communist Party of India (Marxist) from the Communist Party of India.

References

Indian communists 
Revolutionary movement for Indian independence 
1909 births
1962 deaths
Hindustan Socialist Republican Association
Indian independence activists
Communist Party of India politicians from West Bengal
University of Allahabad alumni
People from Paschim Bardhaman district